The 1976 football season was São Paulo's 47th season since club's existence.

Statistics

Scorers

Overall
{|class="wikitable"
|-
|Games played || 63 (28 Campeonato Paulista, 13 Campeonato Brasileiro, 22 Friendly match)
|-
|Games won || 27 (12 Campeonato Paulista, 4 Campeonato Brasileiro, 11 Friendly match)
|-
|Games drawn || 21 (10 Campeonato Paulista, 4 Campeonato Brasileiro, 7 Friendly match)
|-
|Games lost || 15 (6 Campeonato Paulista, 5 Campeonato Brasileiro, 4 Friendly match)
|-
|Goals scored || 89
|-
|Goals conceded || 49
|-
|Goal difference || +40
|-
|Best result || 5–0 (H) v Noroeste - Campeonato Paulista - 1976.08.21
|-
|Worst result || 0–2 (A) v Portuguesa - Friendly match - 1976.02.170–2 (A) v Botafogo-SP - Campeonato Brasileiro - 1976.09.120–2 (H) v Atlético Paranaense - Campeonato Brasileiro - 1976.09.15
|-
|Most appearances || 
|-
|Top scorer || Pedro Rocha and Serginho (15)
|-

Friendlies

II Copa São Paulo (Taça Governador Laudo Natel)

Taça Governador do Estado de São Paulo

Taça Cidade de Maringá

Taça Cidade de Guaíra

Torneio Triangular Piracicabano

Torneio Nunes Freire

Official competitions

Campeonato Paulista

Record

Campeonato Brasileiro

Record

External links
official website 

Association football clubs 1976 season
1976
1976 in Brazilian football